Anna May Wong: In Her Own Words is a 2010 American documentary film written, directed, and produced by Yunah Hong. It chronicles the life and career of the first Asian American Hollywood film star, Anna May Wong. The film later aired on KPBS (TV) May 23, 2014.

Plot 
Anna May Wong was the first Chinese American Hollywood star. As a young girl she knew she wanted to be a movie star, and by 17 she had become one. She went on to act in nearly sixty films in Hollywood, London and Berlin. She was one of the few silent film actors to successfully transition to sound cinema and television. She co-starred with Marlene Dietrich, Anthony Quinn and Douglas Fairbanks along the way. She was beautiful, glamorous, talented and cultured, but she was typecast for most of her career as either a scheming dragon lady or a painted doll. Due to the Hays production code, she could never kiss a Caucasian man on screen, so she could never be the one to end up with the leading man.

The documentary paints a vivid picture of a Hollywood original, summoning Wong's own words, from private correspondences and public interviews, to narrate her own complex and rich history. Actress Doan Ly portrays Anna May Wong in enacted sequences of the documentary. With generous excerpts from Wong's films and archival photographs, Anna May Wong: In Her Own Words is a detailed portrait of an extraordinary woman living ahead of her time. The documentary is an engrossing and imaginative survey of Wong's career, exploring the impact Wong had on images of Asian American women in Hollywood.

Production 
Production of the film began in 2003, with interviews of Susan Ahn Cuddy, A. C. Lyles, Conrad Doerr, Tamlyn Tomita, BD Wong, James Hong, Terence Pepper, Graham Russell Gao Hodges, Karen J Leong, Peter X Feng, Thomas Doherty, and Tim Bergfelder, among others. Shooting of the reenactments with actress Doan Ly was done in 2008. The documentary was shot in the US and England.

The documentary is funded by New York State Council on the Arts, Jerome Foundation, Center for Asian American Media, Asian Women Giving Circle, NY Korean Cultural Service, Tiger Baron Foundation, and Urban Artists Initiatives.

Release 

The documentary first premiered at the Busan International Film Festival, Wide Angle Showcase in Korea on October 9th, 11th, 2010. It was then showcased at numerous festivals, including the Korean American Film Festival of Los Angeles in 2012, the Vancouver Asian Film Festival in 2011, the Asian American International Film Festival, DC Asian Pacific American Film Festival, and the San Francisco International Asian American Film Festival.  It was nationally broadcast by PBS in May 2013, May 2014 and March 2015.  It is distributed by Women Make Movies.

References

External links 
 

2010 films
2010s English-language films
2010 documentary films
American documentary films
2010s American films